Benjamin Samuel Williams (2 March 1822 – 24 June 1890), English orchidologist and nurseryman in London, known mainly for his horticultural notes on orchids in publications such as The Orchid Grower's Manual (London 1852, 7th ed. 1894), Select Orchidaceous Plants (London 1862 onwards) and The Orchid Album (London 1882–97).

Biography
Williams' father James was gardener to Robert Warner, the botanist, at Hoddesdon, and Benjamin began working under his father at the age of fourteen. He first gained prominence as an orchid grower when he was hired by the orchid collector C. B. Warner, whose orchids soon began winning prizes at top orchid shows. Williams was a business partner of Robert Parker's in a nursery at Seven Sisters Road in Holloway between 1854 and 1861, and later moved to the nearby Victoria and Paradise Nurseries.

He is buried on the eastern side of Highgate Cemetery.

This botanist is denoted by the author abbreviation B.S.Williams when citing a botanical name.

References

External links 
 The Orchid Grower's Manual (1885)

English botanists
English botanical writers
Orchidologists
1822 births
1890 deaths
Burials at Highgate Cemetery
English horticulturists
Writers from London
Botanists with author abbreviations
19th-century British botanists
19th-century English businesspeople
19th-century English non-fiction writers